The tantour (tantoor) is a form of cone-shaped women's headdress similar to the hennin, popular in the Levant during the nineteenth century, but seldom seen after 1850 outside of use as a folk costume. 

The tradition persisted longer in Lebanon among the Druze.

The tantour was held in place by ribbons tied around the head. A silk scarf was wound around the base with a white veil attached to the peak. The height and composition of the tantour were proportional to the wealth of its owner, with the most splendid tantours made of gold and reaching as high as thirty inches. Some were encrusted with gems and pearls. 

The tantour was a customary gift presented to the bride by her husband on their wedding day.

Gallery

See also
Hennin
Kokoshnik
Ochipok
Labbade, traditional Lebanese men's headdress
Pointed hat
List of hats and headgear

References

19th-century fashion
Headgear
Hats
Arabic clothing
Middle Eastern clothing
Ottoman clothing
Lebanese fashion
Druze culture
Women's clothing